The 2013 Pirelli World Challenge season was the 24th season of the Sports Car Club of America's World Challenge Series.

Schedule
The season schedule is as follows:

Race results

Championships

Drivers' Championships
Championship points are awarded to drivers based on qualifying and finishing positions. The Pole position winner receives 7 points. In addition, 1 bonus point is awarded to a driver leading a lap during a race, and 3 bonus points are awarded to the driver leading the most laps. The driver who sets the fastest lap of the race receives 1 bonus point.

GT

GTS

Notes
 † Indicates driver received points penalty for rules or driving infraction.

TC

Notes
 † Indicates driver received points penalty for rules or driving infraction.

TCB

Notes
 † Indicates driver received points penalty for rules or driving infraction.

Manufacturer championships
Manufacturer points are awarded according to the highest-finishing car from that manufacturer.  Only manufacturers that are SCCA Pro Racing corporate members receive points.  Points are awarded on the following basis:

In addition, one bonus point is awarded to the pole-winning manufacturer.  In the table below, the manufacturer's top finishing position is shown, with pole winner in bold.

GT

GTS

TC

References

Pirelli World Challenge
GT World Challenge America